Jean Perret Montres SA is a Swiss brand of watchmakers founded in Switzerland in 1893.

History
The company was founded by the Geneva-born Designer, Jean Perret in Geneva, Switzerland. His successors had a long history in the watch industry dating back to 1893. In the beginning of the 21st century Jean Perret Montres SA was taken over by a Saudi Arabian investor. Today the company is held privately by a Swiss family.

Watches
The current collection consists of three main lines: the Slim Line, the Doublette, and the Cool Line. Jean Perret watches vary in pricing according to model and materials but range from about US$500 to about US$2,500. Models that include baguette diamonds can cost considerably more.

See also
List of watch manufactures

References

External links
 Official website

Watch manufacturing companies of Switzerland
Manufacturing companies based in Geneva
Manufacturing companies established in 1893
Swiss watch brands
Privately held companies of Switzerland
Design companies established in 1893
Swiss companies established in 1893